Stepanovka is a rural locality (a village) in Klyuchevsky Selsoviet, Askinsky District, Bashkortostan, Russia. The population was 122 as of 2010. There is 1 street.

Geography 
Stepanovka is located 31 km southwest of Askino (the district's administrative centre) by road. Mishkino is the nearest rural locality.

References 

Rural localities in Askinsky District